Knauth is a surname. Notable people with the surname include:

Felix Knauth (1895–1993), American writer and business executive
Geoffrey Knauth, American free software programmer
Michael Knauth (born 1965), American field hockey player
Oswald Knauth (1887–1962), American economist and business executive
Theodore Knauth (1885–1962), American investment banker, journalist and government official
Victor Knauth (1895–1977), American journalist, publisher, and broadcasting executive